Amathusia schoenbergi , the scalling palmking, is a butterfly found in the  Indomalayan realm It belongs to the Satyrinae, a subfamily of the brush-footed butterflies.

Description

Deep indentations at veins 2, 3, 4, 5 and 6. Male upper hindwing has  a hair pencil (scent pencil-a dorsal glandular fold or oval shaped depression on the wing membrane covered by pencils of long hairs) .

Subspecies
A. s. schoenbergi  Sumatra, Peninsular Malaya
A. s. borneensis   Fruhstorfer, 1899    Borneo

References

Amathusia (butterfly)
Butterflies described in 1888